Kawaguesaga Lake is a lake in Oneida County, Wisconsin near Minocqua. Its inflow and outflow is the Tomahawk River. It is contiguous with Minocqua Lake.

References

External links

Lakes of Oneida County, Wisconsin
Tourist attractions in Oneida County, Wisconsin